Bouenza (can also be written as Buenza) is a department of the Republic of the Congo in the southern part of the country. It borders the departments of Lékoumou, Niari, and Pool, and internationally, the Democratic Republic of the Congo. The regional capital is Madingou.  Towns and cities include Loudima, Mouyondzi, Loutété and Nkayi.

Administrative divisions 
Bouenza Department is divided into one commune and ten districts:

Districts 
 Madingou District
 Mouyondzi District
 Boko-Songho District
 Mfouati District
 Loudima District
 Kayes District
 Former Nkayi District minus Nkayi Commune (?)
 Kingoué District
 Part of the former Mouyondzi District
 Mabombo District
 Part of the former Madingou/Mouyondzi Districts (?)
 Tsiaki District
 Part of the former Mouyondzi District
 Yamba District
 Part of the former Mouyondzi District

Communes 
 Nkayi Commune
 Madingou Commune

Demographics 
The population is 309,073 in 2007, and the area is 12,265.4 km².

Industry and agriculture 
Bouenza has some industry and cash crops. Among the principal activities are a cement factory in Loutété, sugar cane plantations in Nkayi, and there are reserves of copper, lead and zinc. Hydroelectric power is provided by the Moukoukoulou Dam built in Mindouli. Farming includes bananas, palm oil, groundnuts, tobacco and beans.

See also 

 Cement in Africa

References 

 FallingRain Map - centred on Madingou

 
Departments of the Republic of the Congo